The Pamukova train derailment was a fatal railway accident which occurred in 2004 at Pamukova district of Sakarya Province in northwestern Turkey when a higher speed train derailed, at which 41 passengers were killed and 80 injured.

Accident
In the early 2000s, a project was started to construct higher-speed rail lines in Turkey, at first between the highest-populated cities Istanbul and Ankara. Of the 234 passengers and nine crew on board, 41 were killed and 80 injured.

The speeding caused the left wheel of the second passenger car to spring off the track. The train's balance quickly deteriorated, and two following cars coupled to the derailed car drifted sideways. Four cars were overturned, while two cars were damaged heavily, having crashed into each other. The locomotive and the first car remained undamaged on the track, and were taken to Osmaneli railway station after the accident.

Aftermath
An analysis carried out by the railway simulation software Adams/Rail showed that a train running at  would derail at the curve, while one at a speed of  would pass the spot without derailing.

There were no warning signs or signals available at the accident scene. The investigation commission reported that the total journey duration, which was 5 hours and 15 minutes, was too short for the route. The new suggested time was 6 hours. Finally, it was determined that the unsuitable railway infrastructure was one of the main factors that influenced the accident. At the time of the opening of the line one month before, experts had warned the government to modernize the infrastructure before putting higher-speed trains in service.

Immediately after the accident, Binali Yıldırım, the Minister of Transport, Maritime and Communication, was criticized harshly in the public square, and his resignation was demanded. However, he rejected the demands and remained in his office.

Ten years after the accident, the court found the two engineers of the train guilty of negligence causing death. However, since the trial was ruled on over seven-and-half years following the date of the accident, the sentences could not be executed according to Turkish law.

References

2004 disasters in Turkey
2004 in Turkey
Railway accidents in 2004
Derailments in Turkey
History of Sakarya Province
Accidents and incidents involving Turkish State Railways
Binali Yıldırım